Roberto Garcia vs. Antonio Margarito: Latin Fury 14 was a super welterweight boxing fight which took place on May 8, 2010, at the La Feria de San Marcos, in Aguascalientes, Mexico between Roberto García (28-2, 21 KO) and three-division world champion Antonio Margarito (37-6-1, 27 KO).

Details
The fight took place at La Feria de San Marcos, in Aguascalientes, Mexico under the promotion of Top Rank. It was contested at 154 pounds, with the vacant international WBC light middleweight championship on the line.

Margarito won the contest with a unanimous decision of 99-89, 100-88, 99-90.

Undercard
 Jorge Solis defeated  Mario Santiago  for the interim WBA World super featherweight title.
 Mikey Garcia defeated  Pedro Navarrete for USBA featherweight title .
 Rene Gonzalez vs Urbano Antillon for WBA lightweight eliminator .
 Salvador Carreon vs  Juan Jesus Rivera
 Marlon Aguilar vs  Michael Farenas
 Enrique Bernache vs  Arturo Delgado
 Diego Rivera vs  Ricardo Cummings
 Gilberto Flores Hernandez  vs  Yosmani Abreu
 Jose Benavidez vs  Arnoldo Pacheco
 Hanzel Martinez vs  Rene Trujillo

References
 http://boxrec.com/date_search.php?yyyy=2010&mm=05&dd=08

Boxing matches
2010 in boxing
Boxing in Mexico
Sport in Aguascalientes
2010 in Mexican sports
May 2010 sports events in Mexico